Benoît Menut born in Brest (1977) is a French composer of contemporary music.

Publications 
 Joseph-Guy Ropartz, with Mathieu Ferey, 2005, Éditions Papillon

Discography 
 Monologue(s): Trio In memoriam Olivier Greif; Le baiser de marbre noir; Le monologue d'Anna - Ensemble Accroche Note (March 2012, Sonogramme)

References

External links 
 Official website
 Biography on www.musicora.com
 Discography on Discogs
 Benoît Menut Op. 22 Trio "In memoriam Olivier Greif", for violin, cello and piano - 1 (YouTube)

1977 births
Living people
Musicians from Brest, France
Conservatoire de Paris alumni
21st-century French composers
French male composers
21st-century French male musicians